The men's 200 metres event at the 1979 Summer Universiade was held at the Estadio Olimpico Universitario in Mexico City on 10, 11 and 12 September 1979.

Medalists

Results

Heats
Wind:Heat 1: +0.1 m/s, Heat 2: +1.6 m/s, Heat 3: 0.0 m/s, Heat 4: +0.5 m/s, Heat 5: +1.3 m/sHeat 6: +0.7 m/s, Heat 7: +0.1 m/s, Heat 8: +2.3 m/s, Heat 9: +0.2 m/s

Semifinals
Wind:Heat 1: 0.0 m/s, Heat 2: 0.0 m/s, Heat 3: 0.0 m/s

Final

Wind: +1.8 m/s

References

Athletics at the 1979 Summer Universiade
1979